Ersnäs IF is a Swedish football club located in Ersnäs, Luleå.

Background
Ersnäs IF currently plays in Division 4 Norrbotten Södra which is the sixth tier of Swedish football. They play their home matches at the Pålbacka in Luleå.

The club is affiliated to Norrbottens Fotbollförbund.

Season to season

In their most successful period Ersnäs IF competed in the following divisions:

In recent seasons Ersnäs IF have competed in the following divisions:

Footnotes

External links
 Ersnäs IF – Official website
 Ersnäs IF on Facebook

Football clubs in Norrbotten County
1933 establishments in Sweden